Jack "Roy" Zander (6 July 1910 – 29 July 2002) was an Australian rules footballer who played with Hawthorn in the Victorian Football League (VFL). His name is also written as Roy Zanders in some sources.

Sources

 Holmesby, Russell & Main, Jim (2007). The Encyclopedia of AFL Footballers. 7th ed. Melbourne: Bas Publishing.

1910 births
2002 deaths
Australian rules footballers from Melbourne
Hawthorn Football Club players
People from Mitcham, Victoria